The Warren County Courthouse is in Belvidere, the county seat of Warren County, New Jersey. It is part of the 13th vicinage.

It was built 1826 by L. H. Lewis on land donated by Garret Dorset Wall. It was renovated in 1953 and expanded with an addition in 1961.

It is a contributing property to the Belvidere Historic District, added to the National Register of Historic Places on October 3, 1980.

See also
County courthouses in New Jersey
Federal courthouses in New Jersey
Richard J. Hughes Justice Complex

References

County courthouses in New Jersey
Government buildings completed in 1826
1826 establishments in New Jersey
Belvidere, New Jersey
New Jersey Register of Historic Places
Courthouses on the National Register of Historic Places in New Jersey
Buildings and structures in Warren County, New Jersey
Historic district contributing properties in New Jersey